Robert van Asseliers (2 December 1576 – 28 November 1661) was the chancellor of Brabant from 1651 until 1661.

Early life 
Coming from a family of officeholders in the duchy of Brabant, Asseliers studied at the University of Leuven, graduating as a Doctor of Law. He married Antoinette Vandenberghe in 1608; they had a son and two daughters.

Career 
In 1619, Asseliers succeeded his father as a councillor on the Council of Brabant. He went on to become a member of the Privy Council of the Habsburg Netherlands], the Council of State, and the Supreme Council of Flanders in Madrid. 

Asseliers became chancellor of Brabant on 5 May 1651. Because of his advanced age—taking office at the age of 74—a vice-chancellor, Joannes van Thulden, brother of Diodorus Tuldenus, was appointed to help him in office. Asseliers died on 28 November 1661.

References

Footnotes

Bibliography

External links 
 

Lawyers of the Habsburg Netherlands
Jurists of the Spanish Netherlands
1576 births
1661 deaths
Chancellors of Brabant
Politicians from Antwerp
People from the Duchy of Brabant
Politicians from Brussels
Old University of Leuven alumni